Jarrett Green "Jerry" Melvin (July 22, 1929 – February 19, 2020) was an American politician in the state of Florida.

Melvin was born in Bonifay, Florida. He was an alumnus of the College of Charleston, American University of Washington, and Eglin Air Force Base Extension of Florida State University. Melvin also served in the Florida National Guard. He served in the Florida House of Representatives from November 5, 1968, to November 7, 1978, as a Republican, representing the 5th district. On November 8, 1994, he was elected to serve the 4th district; he would serve until November 5, 2002. In 2001, a resolution was passed to bestow the title of Dean of the Florida House of Representatives on him.

References

1929 births
2020 deaths
Republican Party members of the Florida House of Representatives
People from Bonifay, Florida
Florida National Guard personnel
College of Charleston alumni
Florida State University alumni
Washington University in St. Louis alumni